ODVA may refer to:

Oklahoma Department of Veterans Affairs
Oregon Department of Veterans' Affairs
ODVA (company) (formerly Open DeviceNet Vendors Association, Inc.), founded 1995, a global trade and standard development organization whose members are suppliers of devices for industrial automation applications.